Mike S. Ryan is an American film producer. He is most known for producing the indie hit feature Junebug, starring Amy Adams. Adams received a nomination for the 2006 Academy Award for Best Performance by an Actress in a Supporting Role, making it one of the most inexpensive films to ever receive a nomination. He has gone on to make films with such auteurs as Kelly Reichardt, Hal Hartley, Bela Tarr, Todd Solondz, and Rick Alverson.

In 2006, Ryan was nominated for an Independent Spirit Producer of the Year Award and was one of Variety's 2007 “10 Producers to Watch." His works have included Old Joy, Choke, and Palindromes. He began his career as a location manager for Ang Lee and an associate producer for MTV. Ted Hope has been credited with mentoring Ryan throughout his career. Ryan is also an Irish EU citizen, allowing him to produce in the EU co-producing system. His most recent over-seas project, The Cry of Granuaile, will make its world premiere at the Virgin Media Dublin International Film Festival in March 2022.

Ryan is a member of the Academy of Motion Picture Arts and Sciences. He is a mentor & lecturer in many capacities, including at the Venice Bienniale College Cinema, Trans Atlantic Partners Berlin, and Attagirl Screen Australia.

Filmography

As producer
Stay at Conder Beach (2019)Reunion (2018)Faith (2018)The Artist's Wife (2018)The Sweet Life (2017)Maya Dardel (2017)Sweet, Sweet Lonely Girl (2016)The Missing Girl (2015)Free in Deed (2015)Last Weekend (2014)Between Us (2012)The Comedy (2012)Losers Take All (2011)About Sunny (2011)Lake City (2008)Liberty Kid (2007)Fay Grim (2006)Junebug (2005)Palindromes (2004)

ShortMidwinter (2016)

As executive producerThe Cry of Granuaile (2020)The Turin Horse (2011)Meek's Cutoff (2010)Audrey the Trainwreck (2010)Life During Wartime (2009)Choke (2008)Old Joy (2006)

ShortOpen My Eyes (2015) Weekend Away (2013)A Little Lost (2011)

As line producerGrain (2017)Soy Nero (2016)Forty Shades of Blue'' (2005)

Notes

External links
 

American film producers
Living people
Year of birth missing (living people)
Place of birth missing (living people)